Origbaajo Ismaila (born 4 August 1998) is a Nigerian footballer currently playing as a forward for Kyoto Sanga FC of J1 League.

Career statistics

Club
.

Notes

References

External links

1998 births
Living people
Nigerian footballers
Nigerian expatriate footballers
Association football forwards
J1 League players
J2 League players
J3 League players
Gateway United F.C. players
Cercle de Joachim SC players
Fukushima United FC players
Kyoto Sanga FC players
Nigerian expatriate sportspeople in Mauritius
Expatriate footballers in Mauritius
Nigerian expatriate sportspeople in Japan
Expatriate footballers in Japan
People from Ilorin